The 2010 Virginia Tech Hokies football team represented Virginia Polytechnic Institute and State University in the 2010 NCAA Division I FBS college football season. The Hokies were led by 24th-year head coach Frank Beamer and played their home games at Lane Stadium. They were champions of the Atlantic Coast Conference after winning the Coastal Division and defeating Florida State 44–33 in the 2010 ACC Championship Game.

The 2010 Hokies were only the second-ever team ranked in the AP Poll to lose to a FCS opponent (James Madison).  (The other ranked team to lose to a FCS team is #5 Michigan in 2007 to Appalachian State.) The loss was the team's second in six days, as it also lost to then #3 ranked Boise State at FedExField in Landover, MD in a nationally televised Monday night contest.

After the JMU loss, Tech reeled off ten straight wins and became the first team to go undefeated in ACC play since Florida State in 2000. It finished its regular season with a 10-2 record and now holds the longest streak of ten-win seasons in the NCAA with seven. Tech played Stanford in the Discover Orange Bowl after they beat Florida State 44–33 in the 2010 ACC Championship Game. They lost to Stanford by a score of 40–12.

Schedule

Rankings

Roster

Coaching staff

Flyovers
Virginia Tech home games have featured flyovers by military aircraft.

References

Virginia Tech
Virginia Tech Hokies football seasons
Atlantic Coast Conference football champion seasons
Virginia Tech Hokies football